The 2017 Barcelona GP3 Series round was the first round of the 2017 GP3 Series. It was held on 13 and 14 May 2017 at the Circuit de Barcelona-Catalunya in Montmeló, Catalonia, Spain. The race supported the 2017 Spanish Grand Prix.

Classification

Qualifying

Feature Race

Sprint Race

Championship standings after the round

Drivers' Championship standings

Teams' Championship standings

 Note: Only the top five positions are included for both sets of standings.

Notes

References

|- style="text-align:center"
|width="35%"|Previous race:
|width="30%"|GP3 Series2017 season
|width="40%"|Next race:

Barcelona
GP3
GP3